Camira is a suburb in the City of Ipswich, Queensland, Australia.

Geography 

History 
The origin of the suburb name is from an Aboriginal word meaning windy.

Camira State School opened on 29 January 1974.

At the  Camira had a population of 7,391 people.

In the  Camira had a population of 7,414 people.

Education
Camira State School is a government primary (Prep-6) school for boys and girls at 184-202 Old Logan Road. In 2018, the school had an enrolment of 617 students with 42 teachers (40 full-time equivalent) and 30 non-teaching staff (21 full-time equivalent).  It includes a special education program.

Amenities 
The Ipswich City Council operates a fortnightly mobile library service which visits the community centre.

References

External links
 University of Queensland: Queensland Places: Camira

Suburbs of Ipswich, Queensland